Dorothy Damaschke (August 26, 1917 – January 7, 2000) was an outfielder who played in the All-American Girls Professional Baseball League. Listed at 5' 3", 135 lb., she batted and threw right handed.

Born in Racine, Wisconsin, Damaschke was a prominent softball pitcher during eight years before her marriage in 1938.

Filling in during her college years, Damaschke broke into the league at age 27 with her hometown Racine Belles in its 1945 season. She went hitless in two at bats during her only game in the league.

After baseball, Damaschke developed as a badminton player and claimed a champion title in Racine.

The All-American Girls Professional Baseball League folded in 1954, but there is a permanent display at the Baseball Hall of Fame and Museum at Cooperstown, New York since November 5, 1988, that honors the entire league rather than any individual figure.

Sources

1917 births
2000 deaths
All-American Girls Professional Baseball League players
Racine Belles (1943–1950) players
Softball players from Wisconsin
Baseball players from Wisconsin
Sportspeople from Racine, Wisconsin
20th-century American women
20th-century American people